JackBe Corporation was a privately held vendor of enterprise mashup software for real-time intelligence applications.  In August 2013 JackBe was acquired by Software AG

JackBe's flagship product is an enterprise mashup platform called Presto, which is used for enterprise mashups, business management dashboards, and real-time intelligence applications.

Enterprise Mashup Products
JackBe’s main product, Presto, is an enterprise mashup platform.  Presto provides real-time intelligence through functionality for self-service, on-demand data integration, and business dashboards.

JackBe launched a cloud computing-based version of its Presto product in March 2010. It is hosted on Amazon EC2. Jackbe launched Mashup Sites for  SharePoint (MSS) in July 2010
Jackbe announced an Enterprise App Depot in 2010 as a platform for creating internal application directories. The Enterprise App Depot is aimed at non-developers (business users), allowing them to create new business applications and then share the applications with other users. Industry analyst Joe McKendrick described the Enterprise App Store as a "cool idea" on ZDNet.

See also
Mashup (web application hybrid)
EMML
Real-time business intelligence

References

External links
Company website

Mashup (web application hybrid)
Software companies based in Maryland
Web services
Web development software
Rich web applications
Development software companies
Service-oriented (business computing)
2013 mergers and acquisitions
Business intelligence companies
Real-time computing
Defunct software companies of the United States